Setina is a genus of moths in the family Erebidae.

Species
 Setina alpestris Zeller, 1865
 Setina atroradiata Walker, 1864
 Setina aurata Menetries, 1832
 Setina aurita Esper, 1787
 Setina cantabrica de Freina & Witt, 1985
 Setina flavicans (Geyer, 1836)
 Setina irrorella Linnaeus, 1758
 Setina roscida (Denis & Schiffermüller, 1775)

References
Natural History Museum Lepidoptera generic names catalog

Endrosina
Moth genera